Anbil is a Tamil male given name. Due to the Tamil tradition of using patronymic surnames it may also be a surname for males and females.

Notable people

Given name
 Anbil P. Dharmalingam, Indian politician

Surname
 Anbil Periyasamy, Indian politician
 Anbil Poyyamozhi, Indian politician

Other uses
 Anbil Dharmalingam Agricultural College and Research Institute, college in Tamil Nadu
 Anbilalanturai, temple in Tamil Nadu

See also
 

Tamil masculine given names